The Iron Glove is a 1954 American historical adventure film directed by William Castle and starring Robert Stack, Ursula Thiess and Richard Stapley. It was based on the adventures of the Jacobite Charles Wogan.

Plot
Irish Jacobite Charles Wogan comes to Scotland and attempts to aid Prince James Stuart in his quest to overthrow King George I.

Cast
 Robert Stack as Charles Wogan
 Ursula Thiess as Ann Brett
 Richard Wylee as Prince James Stuart (as Richard Stapley)
 Charles Irwin as Timothy O'Toole
 Alan Hale, Jr. as Patrick Gaydon
 Leslie Bradley as Duke of Somerfield
 Louis Merrill as Count DuLusac  
 Paul Cavanagh as Cavenly, advisor to Prince James
 Otto Waldis as George I of Great Britain (uncredited)
 Rica Owen as Princess Maria Clementina Sobieska (uncredited)
 David Bruce as Austrian Sergeant at Tavern (uncredited)

Production
It was originally called The Kiss and the Sword and was meant to star Cornel Wilde. Sam Katzman announced it in May 1952.

In November 1952, Katzman amended his contract with Columbia to make 15 films a year for seven years, for one that allowed him to make 20 films (17 features and three serials). The films in 1953 would include The Kiss and the Sword.

In August 1953, Katzman announced the film would be made as part of a slate of five films to be made between August 18 and December 15 that year, the others being Battle of Rogue River, Pirates of Tripoli, The Miami Story, and Jungle Maneater.

In September, Katzman announced the female lead would be played by Ursula Thiess, who had been brought out from Germany by RKO two years previously, but had not made any movies. The same month, Robert Stack was cast as the male lead.

The sets were designed by  art director Paul Palmentola. It was shot in Technicolor.

Robert Stack later wrote, "I wore tights and sang a song, and if that wasn't enough to kill off an already ill-fated film, I don't know what else would."

References

External links

1954 films
1950s historical adventure films
American historical adventure films
Columbia Pictures films
Films set in the 1710s
Films directed by William Castle
1950s English-language films
1950s American films